Prior to its uniform adoption of proportional representation in 1999, the United Kingdom used first-past-the-post for the European elections in England, Scotland and Wales. The European Parliament constituencies used under that system were smaller than the later regional constituencies and only had one Member of the European Parliament each. The constituency of Wiltshire was one of them.

The constituency consisted of the Westminster Parliament constituencies of Devizes, Newbury, North Wiltshire, Salisbury, Swindon, Wantage, Westbury.

The constituency was represented for the whole of its existence by Caroline Jackson. At the 1994 European election, there were boundary changes. Most of Wiltshire then became part of the new Wiltshire North and Bath constituency, which again elected Caroline Jackson.

Members of the European Parliament

Election results

See also
Wiltshire North and Bath (European Parliament constituency)

References

External links
 David Boothroyd's United Kingdom Election Results

European Parliament constituencies in England (1979–1999)
Politics of Wiltshire
1984 establishments in England
1994 disestablishments in England
Constituencies established in 1984
Constituencies disestablished in 1994